Tracy Kirabo, known professionally as Pia Pounds, is a Ugandan singer-songwriter and performer of the electronic dance and afrobeat music.

Career
Pia Pounds career started in 2011 when she
released her first single Just the way you are
featuring Ragga Dee while still in secondary school. She took a hiatus in music and returned to finish high school. She returned into music while she was a sophomore student at university in 2017.

She was signed by Eddy Kenzo’s Big Talent Entertainment label in 2018. Under Big Talent, Pounds' biggest releases were Tubawe and Wawangula.

She refused to renew her contract with the label and exited Big Talent Entertainment and started releasing her music as an independent artist in 2019.

She then released songs like Byompa featuring Fik Fameica, Easy, and Delicious.

In 2020, during the COVID-19 pandemic quarantine and lock-down around the world, Pounds released a love song titled Bintwala about missing the person she loves during the quarantine period.

Personal life

Pounds was allegedly secretly dating her boss Eddy Kenzo when he separated with his then partner Rema. She refuted the allegations and got engaged to her photographer Daville in a lavish party but soon after broke off the engagement.

Discography

Singles

References

External links

1996 births
Living people
Ugandan musicians